Kajangala, refers to a territory located near Rajmahal in ancient times, in eastern part of India.

Extent
It was spread across what is now part of Birbhum district in West Bengal and Santhal Parganas in Jharkhand.

History       
The Pali Vinayaka-pitaka fixed the eastern limit of Aryavarta (land of the Aryans) at Kajangala.

References

Historical Indian regions
Ancient divisions in Bengal